Galen Fiss (July 30, 1931 – July 17, 2006) was a National Football League linebacker who played 11 seasons with the Cleveland Browns. Fiss was captain on Cleveland's NFL championship team in 1964. Fiss, who had Alzheimer's disease, died of cardiac arrest in 2006.

Fiss was inducted into the Kansas Sports Hall of Fame in 2017.

References

1931 births
2006 deaths
People from Stanton County, Kansas
American football linebackers
Kansas Jayhawks football players
Cleveland Browns players
Eastern Conference Pro Bowl players